Carl Lundsteen (23 August 1912 – 27 April 1989) was a Danish footballer. He played in three matches for the Denmark national football team in 1934.

References

External links
 

1912 births
1989 deaths
Danish men's footballers
Denmark international footballers
Place of birth missing
Association footballers not categorized by position